RC Yantra Gabrovo is a Bulgarian rugby club in Gabrovo.

History
The club was founded in 1973.

Players

Current squad

Honours
Bulgarian Cup: 6 times
Bulgarian Sevens: 3 times

References

External links
RC Yantra Gabrovo

Bulgarian rugby union teams
Rugby clubs established in 1973
Gabrovo
1973 establishments in Bulgaria

You can find more information at the club facebook page at: https://www.facebook.com/yantrarugbyclub/